Richardson de la Cruz (born April 22, 1986), better known by his stage name Chad Kinis, is a Filipino actor, comedian, and YouTuber. He is an artist under Viva Entertainment Inc.

Career
He first joined It's Showtime's segment "Miss Q and A". Despite not winning the Miss Q and A crown, Chad's appearance in "Miss Q and A" led to his career as a performer as well as a part of the vlogging collective Beks Battalion with MC and Lassy.

On March 6, 2020, he released his debut single "Basta Panget" under Viva Records.

Personal life

In March 2021, Kinis revealed in a vlog that he along with fellow Beks Battalion members tested positive for COVID-19, from which they eventually recovered.

Filmography

Television

Film

Discography

References

External links
 

People from Quezon City
Filipino male television actors
1986 births
Living people
Filipino male film actors
21st-century Filipino male actors